A partial solar eclipse occurred on July 19, 1917. A solar eclipse occurs when the Moon passes between Earth and the Sun, thereby totally or partly obscuring the image of the Sun for a viewer on Earth. A partial solar eclipse occurs in the polar regions of the Earth when the center of the Moon's shadow misses the Earth.

Related eclipses

Solar eclipses of 1913–1917

References

External links 

1917 7 19
1917 in science
1917 7 19
July 1917 events